George William Patton (October 7, 1912 – March 15, 1986) was a professional baseball player.  He was a catcher for one season (1935) with the Philadelphia Athletics.  For his career, he compiled a .300 batting average in 10 at-bats, with two runs batted in.

An alumnus of Temple University, he was born in Cornwall, Pennsylvania and later died in Philadelphia at the age of 73.

External links

1912 births
1986 deaths
Philadelphia Athletics players
Major League Baseball catchers
Baseball players from Pennsylvania
Elmira Pioneers players
Anniston Rams players
Greenwood Dodgers players
Mobile Shippers players
Temple Owls baseball players
People from Cornwall, Pennsylvania